William Charles Parker (1892–1979), was an English bowls player who competed at the Commonwealth Games.

Bowls career
He participated in the 1954 British Empire and Commonwealth Games at Vancouver, British Columbia, Canada in the rinks/fours event finishing 8th.

Personal life
He was a Company Director for a scrap metal works and steel merchants by trade and lived in Beaulieu Gardens, W21, London.

References

English male bowls players
Bowls players at the 1954 British Empire and Commonwealth Games
1892 births
1979 deaths
Commonwealth Games competitors for England